Amath André Diedhiou (born 19 November 1989, Dakar) is a Senegalese footballer who last played for UE Engordany.

Career
Diedhiou joined Sheriff Tiraspol in January 2009.

Career statistics

Honours
 Sheriff Tiraspol
 Moldovan National Division (2): 2008–09, 2009–10
 Moldovan Cup (2): 2008–09, 2009–10

References

External links

1989 births
Living people
Senegalese footballers
Senegalese expatriate footballers
Expatriate footballers in Moldova
Expatriate footballers in France
Moldovan Super Liga players
Championnat National players
Championnat National 2 players
FC Sheriff Tiraspol players
US Quevilly-Rouen Métropole players
Association football forwards
Senegalese expatriate sportspeople in Moldova
Senegalese expatriate sportspeople in France